Ripley High School is a public school in Ripley, West Virginia, serving the town of Ripley and the immediate surrounding areas in Jackson County, West Virginia.  The school receives feeder students from Ripley Middle School.

History 
In the summer of 1913, Ripley High School was established, and in the following school year, 23 students were enrolled. In order to uphold its legal right to exist as an educational institution, it had to combine with the grade school in the following year due to an extremely low number of students. In 1917, better efforts were made to build the school, and additional rooms were made accordingly. In 1918, however, the infamous Spanish flu pandemic swept across America, and health authorities suspended the school, locking the doors until January 1, 1919. In the autumn of the same year, the school succeeded in voting for the construction of a new building, but it wasn't finished until 1922. Classes continued in that building for almost twenty-eight years until the present building was constructed in 1950, and it has steadily increased since then with additional buildings. In 2002, the Main Building of the school received a multimillion-dollar facelift. The football field, known as "Memorial Stadium" or "Death Valley" received new astroturf during the fall of 2004. In 2008, construction began on a chemistry lab addition, which was finished in 2009. In the summer of 2018, the astroturf of "Death Valley" was replaced by the first of September.

Alma Mater 
"Dear old Ripley High we love you, and to you we'll always cheer. And the victories you are winning will echo year to year. And to you we're always faithful - we are with you do or die. You're the right school, blue and white school - dear old Ripley High!"

Notable alumni
Charles C. Lanham, West Virginia State Senator and businessman

Notable faculty
Virginia Starcher, member of the West Virginia House of Delegates

References

External links
 

Public high schools in West Virginia
Educational institutions established in 1913
Schools in Jackson County, West Virginia
1913 establishments in West Virginia